Octanitrocubane (molecular formula: C8(NO2)8) is a high explosive that, like TNT, is shock-insensitive (not readily detonated by shock).  The octanitrocubane molecule has the same chemical structure as cubane (C8H8) except that each of the eight hydrogen atoms is replaced by a nitro group (NO2).

It is however not as powerful an explosive as once thought, as the high-density theoretical crystal structure has not been achieved. For this reason heptanitrocubane, the slightly less nitrated form is believed to have marginally better performance, despite having a worse oxygen balance.

Octanitrocubane is thought to have 20–25% greater performance than HMX (octogen).  This increase in power is due to its highly expansive breakdown into CO2 and N2, as well as to the presence of strained chemical bonds in the molecule which have stored potential energy. In addition, it produces no water vapor upon combustion, making it less visible, and both the chemical itself and its decomposition products (nitrogen and carbon dioxide) are considered to be non-toxic.

Octanitrocubane was first synthesized by Philip Eaton (who was also the first to synthesize cubane in 1964) and Mao-Xi Zhang at the University of Chicago in 1999, with the structure proven by crystallographer Richard Gilardi of the United States Naval Research Laboratory. Not enough has been synthesized, though, for performance testing as an explosive.

Synthesis 
Although octanitrocubane is predicted to be one of the most effective explosives, the difficulty of its synthesis inhibits practical use. Philip Eaton's synthesis was difficult and lengthy, and required cubane (rare enough to begin with) as a starting point. As a result, octanitrocubane is more valuable, gram for gram, than gold.

A proposed path to synthesis is the cyclotetramerization of the as yet undiscovered and presumably highly unstable dinitroacetylene.

See also
 4,4′-Dinitro-3,3′-diazenofuroxan
 Hexanitrohexaazaisowurtzitane
 RE factor

Notes

References

External links
 "American Chemical Society lauds difficult synthesis of new compound" (by Philip Eaton), March 20, 2001

Explosive chemicals
Nitro compounds
Substances discovered in the 1990s